Bruno de Monès is a French photographer, born  in Orléans. He is known for his black and white portraits of artists and intellectuals such as Klaus Kinski, Charles Aznavour, Salvador Dalí, Burt Lancaster and Claude Lévi-Strauss.

Life 
After having spent his teenage years in Morocco, Bruno de Monès moved to Paris in the middle of the seventies.  He became the assistant of fashion photographer Jean Clemmer; then he joined in 1976 the audiovisual department of the Charles of the Ritz / Yves Saint Laurent perfumes company as photographer and assistant director. During this time he decided to make portraits of personalities from the arts. These black and white pictures in sharp contrast were the subject of an exhibition at the Espace Canon (Les Yeux du miroir, Paris, 1980) and were published in a photograph album (Visages connus, faces caches.)

In the years 1980–1990, he worked for newspapers and was one of the official photographer of the Magazine Littéraire. He took famous photographs of numerous writers and intellectuals.  He also worked in the ads and fashion with essentially Japan published works. In 1994, he was one of the founders of the Mois off de la photo in Paris.

In 2010 a retrospective exhibition on his work was organized in Paris (Théâtre de l'Odéon).  More than 100 portraits were exhibited under the arcades of the theater and in the streets around. Since the eighties until today, the works of Bruno de Monès are published in French newspapers and magazines. The photographer is also frequently published in Europe, America and Asia.  Since 2010, he works on scriptwriting projects.

Bibliography 

 Visages connus, Faces cachées, La Butte aux Cailles (1983)
 The Fourfold View of a Star, Heaven (1993), published in Japan and the United States
 Publication in third-party works:
 Portraits pour un siècle / Cent écrivains: portraits of Michel Foucault and V. S. Naipaul (Gallimard and Roger-Viollet, 2011)
 Aznavour en haut de l'affiche, by Charles Aznavour (Flammarion, 2011)
"Quelques philosophes": portraits of famous philosophers in La Règle du jeu's issue nr. 74 (dir. Bernard Henri Levy, ed. Grasset, novembre 2021)
 Publication of personal projects:
 Zoom no. 81, 97, 131
 Vis à vis International
 Photographies Magazine
 Photo Revue

Significant works 

 Photographs:
 Klaus Kinski, 1977
 Serge Gainsbourg, 1978
 Françoise Hardy, 1978
 Burt Lancaster, 1979
 Michel Foucault, 1984
 Claude Lévi-Strauss, 1985
 Gilles Deleuze, 1988
 Jean Nouvel, 1991
 Fashion: fashion prestige booklet for the clothing line Be Released (Tokyo, 1986)
 Ads:
 4m x 3m poster campaign for the concerts of Claude Nougaro in Paris (Olympia) and province, and realization of two album covers, 1981
 Advertising campaign (print and display): Paco Rabanne for Japon en 1987
 Intervention in the media:
 Participations in José Arthur's Pop-Club (France Inter) between 1978 and 1993
 Le Barbier de nuit (Europe 1) with Léo Malet

Noteworthy exhibitions 

 Le Bistrot d'Isa, Paris, Septembre 1977
 Les Yeux du miroir, Espace Canon in Paris, 1980
 Objectif Mode with Thierry Arditti, Cynthia Hampton, Paolo Calia and Satoshi, Galerie Viviane Esders in Paris, 1988
 Gueules de Stars (with Eddy Brière), Galerie-Librairie le 29 in Paris, 2010
 Exposition de 100 portraits de Bruno de Monès au Théâtre de l'Odéon (et autour), rétrospective in Paris, 2010
 Galerie Intuiti, Paris, 2014

External links 

 Bruno de Monès' official website
 Bruno de Monès – Roger-Viollet Agency : the agency holds the exclusive distribution rights of many Bruno de Monès' photographs
 Page of the National Library of France dedicated to Bruno de Monès

Notes 

1952 births
Artists from Paris
French photographers
Portrait photographers
Living people